Provel is a white processed cheese product particularly popular in St. Louis cuisine, that is a combination of cheddar, Swiss, and provolone cheeses. Provel has a low melting point, and therefore has a gooey and almost buttery texture at room temperature. It is the traditional topping for St. Louis-style pizza. It is also often used in the preparation of cheese soup and served on salads, chicken, and the Gerber sandwich. Some restaurants use Provel for their pasta dishes with white sauce instead of the customary fresh Italian cheese and cream.

Popular in the St. Louis area, Provel is rarely used elsewhere. Provel can, however, be purchased at Hy-Vee grocery stores throughout the Midwest.

According to former St. Louis Post-Dispatch food critic Joe Bonwich, Provel was invented specifically for St. Louis-style pizza more than a half-century ago by the downtown firm Costa Grocery (now Roma Grocery on the Hill, a St. Louis neighborhood consisting primarily of people of Italian lineage), in collaboration with the Hoffman Dairy Company of Wisconsin (now part of Kraft Foods).  Bonwich states that Provel was developed to meet perceived demand for a pizza cheese with a "clean bite": one that melts well but breaks off nicely when the diner bites down. Neither of Bonwich's sources at Kraft and Roma had a definitive answer for the origin of the name, although one popular theory is that it is a portmanteau of the words provolone and mozzarella, two of the cheeses for which it is substituted. Another rumored name origin is that "Provel" comes from the name provolone, removing the "-one" as it is made up of more than one type of cheese.

As a processed cheese, Provel is subject to FDA guidelines on labeling cheese.

The trademark on the "Provel" name, first used in 1947, was held by the Churny Company, Inc. of Glenview, Illinois. Churny then became a wholly owned subsidiary of Kraft Foods after it was closed in 2012.

References

External links
 Churny Co. site (archived, 2 Mar 2021)
 "Famous Gerber sandwich recognized", Riverfront Times, 8 October 2003

American cheeses
Cuisine of St. Louis
Cuisine of the Midwestern United States
Processed cheese